Alan, 1st Earl of Richmond (before 1100 – 15 September 1146),  Breton Alan Penteur, also known as "Alan the Black", was a Breton noble who fought for Stephen, King of England.  Alan was the third son of Stephen, Count of Tréguier, and Hawise de Guingamp.

Life
The Honour of Richmond had been founded by Alan's uncle, Count Alan Rufus, who had died heirless, so it passed to a younger brother, Count Alan the Black, and then to a yet younger brother, namely Count Stephen. After Count Stephen's death in 1135/6, his Breton lands were inherited by his eldest son, Geoffrey Boterel II, whereas his English lands, the Honour of Richmond, went to Alan.  During the Anarchy, Geoffrey supported the dispossessed Empress Matilda and her husband Geoffrey of Anjou, while Alan allied with King Stephen.  Alan married Bertha of Brittany, daughter of Conan III, Duke of Brittany, in a politically arranged marriage, perhaps in a move to draw Brittany onto Stephen's side in the conflict against Empress Matilda. In part to promote the alliance with Conan III of Brittany. Stephen created Alan 1st Earl of Richmond.  Additionally, Stephen recognized Alan as Earl of Cornwall, in recognition of another of Alan's uncles, Brian, who, Alan claimed, had formerly possessed Cornwall. After the Battle of Lincoln (1141), Alan was captured by Ranulf de Gernon, 4th Earl of Chester and tortured until he relinquished his claim to the Earldom of Cornwall.

Family
With Bertha, Duchess of Brittany, he had three children:

 Conan IV, Duke of Brittany, their son and heir
 Constance, who married Alan III, Vicomte of Rohan
 Enoguen, abbess of St. Sulpice.

In addition, Alan had four illegitimate sons:
 Bryan FitzAlan, progenitor of the Lords of Bedale in Richmondshire.
 Stephen FitzAlan.
 Reynold FitzAlan.
 Robert FitzAlan.

Succession
Alan died in Brittany by 1146 and was buried at Bégard Monastery. After his death, Bertha returned to Brittany.

His son Conan IV inherited his title as Earl of Richmond and would later inherit the title Duke of Brittany.

Notes

References

Bibliography 
 Barlow, Frank (1955) The Feudal Kingdom of England 1042–1216, London: Longmans, Green; tree opposite p. 288
 
 Galliou, Patrick, & Jones, Michael (1991) The Bretons, Oxford: Blackwell ; p. 191

11th-century births
1146 deaths
Earls of Richmond (1136 creation)
12th-century Breton people
Richmond, Alan, Earl of
Medieval Cornish people
Earls of Cornwall
People of The Anarchy